The Clyde Park Challenge Cup is played at the Brookline Country Club and it is awarded to the best female golfer of that year.

Winners
 1899 Louise A. Wells
 1900 Nellie C. Sargent
 1901 Tiara Fay
 1904 
 1909 Pauline Firth
 1913 Anne Nason

Footnotes

Women's golf tournaments in the United States